ActiveState Software Inc is a Canadian software company headquartered in Vancouver, British Columbia. It develops, sells, and supports cross-platform development tools and secure software supply chain solutions for dynamic languages such as Perl, PHP, Python, Ruby, and Tcl, as well as enterprise services.

ActiveState is owned by its employees and Turn/River Capital, a technology-focused growth equity firm based in San Francisco after briefly being a member of the Sophos group.

History
Acquisition of ActiveState Corp was first announced in September 2003 by Sophos Plc. ActiveState's president Steve Munford who is part of the acquisition will become a member of Sophos's executive management team as Global VP Messaging.

Sophos ownership era
In January 2006, Pender Financial Group which was announced in January 2006 has entered into an agreement with Sophos Inc. to acquire ActiveState Software Inc.

In February 2006, ActiveState Software Inc. announced its acquisition by Pender Financial Group Corporation from Sophos Inc., a subsidiary of Sophos Plc., for the purchase price of US$2,250,000. Following the acquisition, Bart Copeland will become ActiveState Software Inc.'s President and CEO, and Dr. David Ascher will become ActiveState Software Inc.'s CTO and VP of Engineering. Following the sales of ActiveState to PFG, David Ascher of ActiveState revealed that Sophos agreed to sell ActiveState because developing programming tools did not fit Sophos's business model.

Pender Financial Group ownership era
ActiveState was named one of Canada's Top 100 Employers in October 2006 as it was published in Maclean's magazine, along with several other software companies.

Licensing change 

Somewhere around 2013 the licensing model for ActiveState products changed from paid support to paid commercial use.

Subsidiaries
Phenona: In June 2011, ActiveState Software Inc. announced the acquisition of Phenona.
Appsecute Limited: In June 2013, ActiveState Software Inc. announced the acquisition of Appsecute. The acquisition would become ActiveState's strategy to pair Appsecute with Stackato.

Products
 Current ActiveState products include: ActiveState Platform cross-platform automated build tool for Perl, Python, Ruby and Tcl; free and commercial language distributions, ActivePerl, ActivePython, and ActiveTcl for AIX, HP-UX, Linux, OS X, Solaris, and Windows. 
 Former ActiveState products include: ActiveState Komodo, an integrated development environment (IDE) for dynamic languages which is now open source; Perl Dev Kit (PDK) and Tcl Dev Kit (TDK), which have been sunset.

ActiveState Platform 
Automatically builds Python, Perl, Ruby and Tcl packages from source code on demand, and packages them as runtime environments for Windows, Mac and Linux. Features a zero-config cloud-based build system that implements the Supply chain Levels for Software Artifacts (SLSA) standard.

Komodo 
 Komodo 11: Features Smart and responsive autocomplete browser and overall performance symbol for faster performance.
 Komodo 12: Autocomplete becomes more reliable and activates from any position and using one click to control, the package manager and execute commands directly inside the file, supporting Python (pip), PHP (Composer), Perl (PPM), Ruby (Gem), and Node.js (npm and Yarn).

Python 
ActivePython is a software package consisting of the Python (programming language) implementation CPython and a set of extensions, packaged to facilitate installation. As of 2006, it ran on Windows, Mac OS X, Linux, Solaris, AIX and HP-UX platforms. ActivePython for Windows includes the PyWin32 extensions for programming with the Win32 API. It also includes the integrated development environment IDLE, although this requires manual setup.

Stackato
In February 2012, ActiveState announced general availability of Stackato. According to the announcement, Stackato "makes it easy to develop, deploy, migrate, scale, manage, and monitor applications on any cloud", and is available in Enterprise, Micro Cloud, and Sandbox editions.

In December 2012, ActiveState announced the OEM integration of Stackato with HP Cloud Services, specifically the HP Cloud Application Platform as a Service. HP describes the product as "an application platform for development, deployment, and management of cloud applications using any language on any stack".

On July 28, 2015, Hewlett-Packard Development Company, L.P. announced the acquisition of Stackato's business from ActiveState Software Inc.

Enterprise CI/CD 
ActiveState confirmed that its Enterprise CI / CD Survey is available for participation by 2020. Based about how businesses commonly utilize CI / CD and how they address software runtime and create issues, the study is part of ActiveState 's ongoing initiatives to promote the development of open source technology.

References

External links
ActiveState Company site
ActiveState Code site

Software companies of Canada